Gurdev Singh Kular (born 12 August 1933) is a former Indian field hockey player, originally from Sansarpur. He was part of the Indian field hockey team at the 1956 Summer Olympics in Melbourne, which won the gold medal. He was also a member of the field hockey team for the 1958 Tokyo and 1962 Jakarta Asian Games, the latter of which he was captain for. He was also the captain of the gold-medallist Punjab team in the national hockey championship in Bhopal same year. In 1964, he led a team tour to Afghanistan as captain.

References

External links
 
August Birthdays

1933 births
Living people
Olympic field hockey players of India
Olympic gold medalists for India
Field hockey players at the 1956 Summer Olympics
Indian male field hockey players
Field hockey players from Jalandhar
Indian Sikhs
Olympic medalists in field hockey
Asian Games medalists in field hockey
Field hockey players at the 1958 Asian Games
Field hockey players at the 1962 Asian Games
Medalists at the 1956 Summer Olympics
Asian Games silver medalists for India
Medalists at the 1958 Asian Games
Medalists at the 1962 Asian Games